Daniel Ibañes Caetano (born 6 July 1976) is a former Spanish-Brazilian futsal player, best known for his spell with Inter Movistar as an Ala.

Honours
5 League Championships (98/99, 02/03, 03/04, 04/05, 07/08)
7 Cup Championships (97/98, 98/99, 99/00, 03/04, 04/05, 06/07, 08/09)
8 Supercups of Spain (97/98, 98/99, 99/00, 01/02, 03/04, 05/06, 07/08, 08/09)
3 UEFA Futsal Cups (2000, 2004, 2006)
5 Intercontinental Cups (2000, 2005, 2006, 2007, 2008)
1 Recopa of Europe (2008)
2 cups Iberian (03/04, 05/06)
1 World Championship (Guatemala 2000)
1 runner World Cup (Brazil 2008)
4 European Championships (Russia 2001, Czech 2005, Portugal 2007, Hungria 2010)
1 Having chosen Best Player of the LNFS (98/99)
2 times voted best right wing LNFS (98/99, 01/02)
1 Having chosen Best of the Ala-Pivot LNFS (04/05)
1 time top scorer of the LNFS (01/02)
Voted Best Player of the Third World (Guatemala 00)
UEFA Futsal Cup top scorer (99/00)
UEFA Futsal Cup Best Player (99/00)

External links
Futsalplanet profile

1976 births
Living people
Sportspeople from São Paulo
Spanish men's futsal players
Brazilian men's futsal players
Brazilian expatriate sportspeople in Spain
Inter FS players
Caja Segovia FS players
Brazilian emigrants to Spain